Pascal Amanfo is a Nigerian film director, based primarily in the Ghana film industry.

Early life and education 
Amanfo is a native of Awo Omamma in Oru East, Imo State. His mother is from the Esan tribe of Edo State.

Career 
In an interview on The Delay Show Ghana (2014), Amanfo described AMAA award-winning actor, Adjetey Anang as "every director's dream", particularly for his versatility and diligence to acting profession. In 2014, he was listed as one of the top Nigerian film directors by Pulse. In a 2014 interview with Vanguard (Nigeria), Nollywood actress, Sharon Francis described Amanfo as a mentor, who deserve the praise for his tutorship in her quest for stardom. Top Ghanaian actress, Yvonne Nelson speaking on being discovered by Amanfo, stated that he is "one of the top directors in Ghana" and has a way of making difficult situations seem effortless for crew members while on set. In 2011, Amanfo directed Single Six, starring Yvonne Okoro and John Dumelo. In 2013, Amanfo caused a cinematic stir in Nigeria and Ghana, when his film Boko Haram debut. The film was subsequently restricted by Ghanaian authorities and was a flop in Nigeria even though the title was changed to Nation under Siege.  Amanfo released a trailer for Purple Rose (2014) that stars Nse Ikpe Etim. The film is surrounded on the life of an inquisitive journalist. In 2015, BellaNaija described Amanfo's If Tomorrow never Comes as a decent effort in comparison to his previous film. It praised the cinematography, visual effects and sound used in the film.

 Personal life 
Amanfo is a practicing Christian. In 2015, he disclosed that he will be concentrating on living a life that pleased God. He was separated from his wife for some months before reconciling then getting a sponsor for his vow renewal.

 Filmography 
 Sin city
 Bed of RosesOpen ScandalsFamily RunsStalemate (as producer)My Last Wedding (2009)
 Corporate Maid (2008)
 Single and Married Wanna Be Grave YardHouse of Gold (film) Letters to My MotherThe Mystery of Sex Purple Rose If Tomorrow Never Comes Trinity Boko HaramHusband Shopping If You Were Mine Stalmate Single Six 40 Looks Good on You

 Accolades 
 Ghana Movie Awards 
 2011 Ghana Movie Awards - Best Director (Bed of Roses) - nomination
 2012 Ghana Movie Awards - Best Director (Single and Married) - won
 2013 Ghana Movie Awards - Best Writing (House of Gold) - nomination
 2013 Ghana Movie Awards - Best Production Design (House of Gold) - nomination
 2014 Ghana Movie Awards - Best Director (Single, Married and Complicated) - nomination
 2014 Ghana Movie Awards - Best Writing (Single, Married and Complicated) - nomination
 2014 Ghana Movie Awards - Best Production Design (Single, Married and Complicated) - nomination
 2015 Ghana Movie Awards - Best Director (If Tomorrow Never Comes) - nomination
 2015 Ghana Movie Awards - Best Adapted or Original Screenplay (If Tomorrow Never Comes) - nomination

 Golden Icons Academy Movie Awards 
 2012 Golden Icons Academy Movie Awards - Best Original Screenplay (Single Six) - nomination
 2012 Golden Icons Academy Movie Awards - Best Director (Viewers Choice) - nomination
 2013 Golden Icons Academy Movie Awards - Best Director (House of Gold) - nomination

 Africa Magic Viewers Choice Awards 
 2014 Africa Magic Viewers Choice Awards - Best Writer (Single and Married'') - nomination

See also
 List of Nigerian actors
 List of Nigerian film producers
 List of Nigerian film directors

References

External links

Igbo people
Ghanaian film directors
Nigerian film directors
Nigerian Christians
Year of birth missing (living people)
Living people
People from Imo State
Nigerian screenwriters
Ghanaian screenwriters
Nigerian film producers